Malpeque can refer to several different things:

Electoral districts
 Malpeque (electoral district), a federal electoral district in Prince Edward Island, Canada

Geography
 Malpeque Bay, a bay in Prince Edward Island, Canada

Settlements
 Malpeque, an unincorporated rural community in Prince Edward Island, Canada
 Malpeque Bay, Prince Edward Island, an incorporated rural municipality in Prince Edward Island, Canada

Structures
 Malpeque Outer Range Lights, a set of lighthouses operated by the Canadian Coast Guard in Prince Edward Island, Canada
 Malpeque Harbour Approach Range Lights, a set of lighthouses operated by the Canadian Coast Guard in Prince Edward Island, Canada